Gurumayum Gourakishor Sharma is a leading exponent and teacher of thang-ta.

In 2009, he received the high Padma Shri honor award from the Indian Government for his contributions to the preservation and advancement of thang-ta.

See also
Thang-Ta
Indian martial arts
Mukna
Sarit Sarak
Banshay

References 

Recipients of the Padma Shri in arts
Indian male martial artists
Living people
Year of birth missing (living people)